This is a list of electoral results for the Electoral district of West Kimberley in Western Australian state elections.

Members for West Kimberley

Election results

Elections in the 1900s

Elections in the 1890s

References

Western Australian state electoral results by district